Siegfried Friedrich Heinrich Müller (26 October 1920 – 17 April 1983), often called Kongo-Müller, was a former German Wehrmacht officer-candidate who fought as a mercenary under Mike Hoare in the Congo Crisis.

Biography

Siegfried Müller was born in Crossen an der Oder, Germany (modern Krosno Odrzańskie, Poland) in 1920 to a conservative Prussian family. His father served in World War I and later served in the Wehrmacht as a lieutenant-colonel. Siegfried was enrolled at a boarding school in Freiburg and was in the Jungvolk, reaching the rank of  Fähnleinführer. He later served in the Reich Labour Service, and joined the Wehrmacht in 1939. He first experienced action during the German invasion of Poland, where he says he saw very little combat. After this, he claimed he would sometimes dress as a Polish peasant and walk along the lines of the Soviet-occupied Poland in order to scout them out. He also fought in Operation Barbarossa and spent the rest of the war fighting against the Soviets. He claimed to have been promoted to the rank of first lieutenant on April 20, 1945, Hitler's birthday. After being seriously wounded from  being shot in the back, he was evacuated from East Prussia to Frankfurt, where he was captured by the Americans.

Released in 1947, he enlisted in the US Army Civilian Labor Group (CLG), an American Labor Service Unit of Germans; then became a lieutenant in a CLG security unit. He also worked as an Industrial Police watchman and trained NATO troops in Paris. He was denied entry to the Bundeswehr in 1956, but found employment with British Petroleum, clearing mines planted by the Afrika Korps in the Sahara Desert during World War II.

Müller emigrated to South Africa in 1962 and was recruited as a mercenary with the rank of lieutenant in 5 Commando in 1964 as part of the repression of the Simba rebellion in the Congo Crisis.  At 44, Müller was the oldest of Mike Hoare's soldiers. He was promoted to captain after a successful operation to seize Albertville (now Kalemie) and led 52 Commando, a small sub-unit of 5 Commando comprising approximately 53 soldiers, from July 1964.  He was later promoted to major. In this period, the units participated in widespread arbitrary violence, killings, and other war crimes. Pictures show Müller wearing his Iron Cross in the Congo.

As news of atrocities committed by mercenaries in the Congo spread, Müller became a hate figure among socialists and student activists in West Germany. He was first brought to public attention by a feature entitled "Congo Atrocity" in the December 1964 issue of the left-leaning magazine Konkret. Another lengthy interview included Müller speaking nostalgically of his wartime service in German-occupied Poland and France and "concluded with him laughing as he spoke about how he was now compelled to follow the "barbaric customs" of the Congo by not taking wounded opponents prisoner but simply shooting them dead." While in the Congo, Müller had also filmed executing a prisoner in the highly graphic Italian documentary film Africa Addio (1966) which caused mass protests when it was first screened in West Germany and energised the nascent German Third Worldist movement. The historian Quinn Slobodian states "Müller provided a link between Nazi Germany and postcolonial conflict beyond polemical analogy". Also profiled as a hate figure in the East German state media, some instead responded by seeing him as a counterculture icon like the Rolling Stones.

He died in the Boksburg, Gauteng suburb of Johannesburg, South Africa of stomach cancer in April 1983.

In popular culture

Major Müller wore his World War II Iron Cross First Class on his operations in the Congo, which attracted the attention of journalists from Time magazine.

He was interviewed for, and is the subject of, the 1966 East German documentary The Laughing Man-Confessions of a Murderer.

The character Capt. Henlein from the 1968 film Dark of the Sun was based on Müller.

References

Further reading

External links
Siegfried Müller at IMDB

1920 births
1983 deaths
People from Krosno Odrzańskie
People from the Province of Brandenburg
German mercenaries
German emigrants to South Africa
Deaths from cancer in South Africa
Recipients of the Iron Cross (1939), 1st class
German Army officers of World War II
Hitler Youth members
Reich Labour Service members
German prisoners of war in World War II held by the United States
Deaths from stomach cancer
People of the Congo Crisis